The women's middleweight (75 kilograms) event at the 2010 Asian Games took place from 22 to 26 November 2010 at Lingnan Mingzhu Gymnasium, Foshan, China.

Schedule
All times are China Standard Time (UTC+08:00)

Results 
Legend
RSC — Won by referee stop contest

References

External links
Official website

Women's 75